was the eldest regent of the Taira clan patriarch, Taira no Kiyomori. He supported his father in the Heiji Rebellion.  He died two years before his father. His son, Taira no Koremori, became a monk in 1184, and drowned himself. Oda Nobunaga claimed to have descended from him through his grandson, Taira no Chikazane.

Shigemori in The Tale of the Heike

Death

On May 12, 1179, a great whirlwind swept through the capital. Many people died along with many buildings destroyed by the tornado. Only a few days after the incident, he fell ill and died at the age of 42, possible due from smoke that came from the tornado.

The Lanterns
Shigemori built a temple forty-eight bays long, inspired by the forty-eight great vows of the Buddha Amida, and in each bay he hung a lantern. He then became known as the "Lantern Minister".

Gold to China
In 1173, Shigemori made an agreement with a ship captain name Miao Dian in Kyushu. He gave 500 tael of gold to the captain, 3000 to the Song dynasty, 1000 to the monks of Mount Yuwang, and 2000 to purchase paddy fields for the monastery, so that the monks may offer prayers for him in his future lives. Miao Dian received the gold, crossed the ocean, and took it to the land of the Song dynasty.

Children
Taira no Koremori 1158-1184

1138 births
1179 deaths
Taira clan
People of Heian-period Japan
Heian period Buddhist clergy
Deified Japanese people